Filmmakers of the Present - Golden Leopard (Pardo d'oro Cineasti del presente) is an award at the Locarno International Film Festival, presented by the Jury to the best film of the section “Filmmakers of the Present". It was first awarded in 2006. It is dedicated to emerging directors from all over the world and devoted to first, second and third features.

Award winners

References

External links 
 Official site
 IMDb

International film awards
Locarno Festival
Swiss film awards
Awards established in 2006